Government Engineering College, Jagdalpur (GEC Jagdalpur) is a Public engineering college located in Jagdalpur, Chhattisgarh, India. Established in 1983, it is affiliated to Chhattisgarh Swami Vivekanand Technical University, Bhilai. It is one of four Government Engineering College in Chhattisgarh along with Government Engineering College Raipur and [[Government Engineering College, Bilaspur][Government Engineering College, Ambikapur]].

History
Established in March 1983, it was affiliated to Pandit Ravishankar Shukla University, Raipur and started with an intake of 20 students in Civil Engineering. Again Mechanical Engineering was introduced in 1984 with an intake capacity of 30 students. Later, Undergraduate courses in Electronics and Telecommunication (2000), Information Technology (2000), Electrical Engineering (2005), Mining Engineering (2009) and Master of Engineering in Structural Engineering (Civil) (2009) and Thermal Engineering (Mechanical) (2009) started.

Location
The college was started from forest rest house.  In 1990–91, the college shifted in dandakaranya building at Dharampura-1. In 1995–96, it was again shifted in its own present campus. Now, The college campus is spread across an area of 69 acres. It is located in between Dharampura, Negigudha, Gatpadmur and Kalipur. The college campus is surrounded by walls and has three entrance, the main entrance opens in front of Bastar university, second entrance is on the Chitrakote road and the other opens towards residential complex.

Academics

Programmes
The college offers Bachelor of Engineering in various fields (270 seats per annum) as well as Master of Engineering (36 seats per annum).

Departments
Civil Engineering
Mechanical Engineering
Electronics & Telecommunication Engineering
Information Technology
Electrical Engineering
Mining Engineering
Humanities

Admission 
Admission to Bachelor of Engineering is done through Chhattisgarh Pre Engineering Test (CGPET) conducted by Chhattisgarh Professional Examination Board, Naya Raipur.

References

Schools of mines in India
Engineering colleges in Chhattisgarh
Bastar district
Educational institutions established in 1983
1983 establishments in Madhya Pradesh